Ben Hansen (born June 29, 1979) is an American politician, businessman, and chiropractor serving as a member of the Nebraska Legislature from the 16th district. Elected in November 2018, he assumed office on January 9, 2019.

Early life and education 
Hansen was born in Schuyler, Nebraska. He earned an Associate of Science degree from Central Community College in 2000, a Bachelor of Science in psychology from Wayne State College in 2002, and a Doctor of Chiropractic from Palmer College of Chiropractic in 2007.

Career 
Since 2007, Hansen has owned Hansen Chiropractic Wellness Center. He also founded Blair Rent-It Center in 2014 and the Heritage Barnwood Company. He was elected to the Nebraska Legislature in November 2018 and assumed office on January 9, 2019. Hansen is also chair of the Business and Labor Committee.

Electoral history

References 

1979 births
Living people
People from Schuyler, Nebraska
Wayne State College alumni
Palmer College of Chiropractic alumni
American chiropractors
Republican Party Nebraska state senators